Behind the Scenes is a Canadian television series on the Space network that debuted in 1997. It features behind-the-scenes looks at various television series and mini-series on Space, and interviews with their casts and crews.

Featured shows 
 Alienated
 Battlestar Galactica (TV miniseries)
 Battlestar Galactica (2004 TV series)
 Charlie Jade
 The Collector
 The Dead Zone
 Star Trek: Enterprise
 First Wave
 Relic Hunter
 Smallville
 Stargate SG-1
 Starhunter
 Supernatural
 Tracker

External links
 Space - Behind the Scenes

CTV Sci-Fi Channel original programming